Yew Tree may refer to:

Yew, any of various coniferous plants
Yew Tree, West Bromwich, West Midlands, England
Yew Tree Tarn, a lake in the Lake District, England
Yew Tree (ward), an electoral division in Liverpool
Yew Tree Colliery, a coalfield in Tyldesley, Greater Manchester 
Operation Yewtree, a British police investigation into sexual abuse by Jimmy Savile and others